The brown mesite (Mesitornis unicolor) is a ground-dwelling bird endemic to Madagascar. It is one of three species in the mesite family or the Mesitornithidae, and though classified as vulnerable by the International Union for Conservation of Nature (IUCN), it is the most widespread of the three.

Description
This species is a medium-sized terrestrial bird which is often described as rail-like (a family with which the mesites are sometimes placed). The species has a plain face, marked only by a slightly contrasting fleshy eye-ring around a rather large eye and a variable white streak behind the eye. It has a short straight  bill. The upperparts of the bird are rufous brown, the underside tawny with no barring or spotting.

Ecology
The brown mesite is a humid forest species, it forages by walking through the forest floor flicking over leaf-litter in order to find invertebrates. Its rufous brown plumage provides reasonable camouflage on the shady forest floor. One to three eggs are laid in a nest which consists of a loose platform made from twigs and lined with plant fibre and leaves. The eggs are dull white with brown markings on one end. Soon after hatching the chicks leave the nest. It is secretive and rarely seen.
The brown mesite has never been observed flying; this may be simply due to its secretive habits, or it may be because it is in fact flightless.

Distribution
The brown mesite has a patchy distribution in humid evergreen forest along the eastern coast of Madagascar, from Marojejy National Park in the north to Tôlanaro to the south.

Status
The population of this species is patchily distributed, and is vulnerable for preferring lower elevation forests which are under the greatest pressure from human disturbance. It is suspected that the population is rapidly declining because of predation by dogs, rats and by hunting. Its forests are also threatened by logging and subsistence agriculture. The International Union for Conservation of Nature has classified the conservation status of this bird as ″vulnerable″.

References

 Handbook of the Birds of the World, Volume Three, Hoatzin to Auks; de Hoyo, Elliot and Sargatal,

External links
 BirdLife Species Factsheet.
 Image at ADW 

Mesitornis
Birds described in 1845
Taxa named by Marc Athanase Parfait Œillet des Murs
Fauna of the Madagascar lowland forests
Endemic birds of Madagascar